The term Tibetan Empire most commonly refers to the first major Tibetan state, ruled by the Yarlung dynasty.

Tibetan Empire may also refer to:

 Phagmodrupa Dynasty (1354-approx. 1618), whose rulers styled themselves ghongma or "emperor"
 Any of the various Tibetan polities that ruled the area, or the Mongol or Chinese empires that claimed overlordship over it, during the history of Tibet